The Koine Greek term Ego eimi (Greek Ἐγώ εἰμί), literally I am or It is I, is an emphatic form of the copulative verb εἰμι that is recorded in the Gospels to have been spoken by Jesus on several occasions to refer to himself not with the role of a verb but playing the role of a name, in the Gospel of John occurring seven times with specific titles. 
These usages have been the subject of significant Christological analysis.

New Testament
In the New Testament, the personal pronoun ἐγώ in conjunction with the present first-person singular copulative εἰμι is recorded to have been used mainly by Jesus, especially in the Gospel of John.

It is used in the Gospel of John both with and without a predicate nominative. The seven occurrences with a predicate nominative that have resulted in some of the titles for Jesus are:

 I am the Bread of Life (John 6:35)
 I am the Light of the World (John 8:12)
 I am the Door (John 10:9)
 I am the Good Shepherd (John 10:11,14)
 I am the Resurrection and the Life (John 11:25)
 I am the Way and the Truth and the Life (John 14:6)
 I am the Vine (John 15:1,5)

Without predicate nominative
"I am" is also used without a predicate nominative, which is not very common in Koine Greek, thus it is generally interpreted  as a self-declaration by Jesus, identifying Himself as God. In John 8:24 Jesus states: "For unless you believe that I am, you will die in your sins", and later the crowd attempts to stone Jesus in response to his statement in John 8:58: "Before Abraham was, I am". Many other translations, including the American Standard Version, have rendered John 8:24 as something like "... For unless you believe that I am [He], you will die in your sins". Some consider the phrase in John 8:58 to be grammatically different from that in John 8:24, as the copulative verb can be used with any predicative expression and not only a predicate nominative, such as in "ὅπου εἰμὶ ἐγὼ καὶ ὑμεῖς ἦτε" ("where I am, you also may be") in John 14:3. "πρὶν Ἀβραὰμ γενέσθαι" ("before Abraham was") can be taken as a predicative prepositional phrase, thus "ἐγώ εἰμὶ" ("I am") in John 8:58 does not grammatically require a predicate nominative, however it is rather unusual for a present tense verb to be used with a temporal adverb like πρὶν in a declarative statement, though there are rare exceptions outside the New Testament. Thus explanations of John 8:58 generally depend on theology and not Greek grammar.

With predicate nominative

There are other times the phrase is used in the New Testament, but with a predicate nominative and/or adjectives in between ἐγώ and εἰμι : a centurion in Matt 8:9 and Luke 7:8, Zechariah in Luke 1:18, Gabriel in Luke 1:19, a man blind from birth in John 9:9 who is healed by Jesus and told to go wash in the Pool of Siloam, Peter in Acts 10:21 and Acts 10:26, Paul the Apostle in Acts 22:3, Acts 23:6, Acts 26:29, Rom 7:14, Rom 11:1, Rom 11:13, 1 Cor 15:9 and 1 Tim 1:15, some Corinthian believer in 1 Cor 1:12 and 1 Cor 3:4, John the Baptist in the negative (οὐκ εἰμὶ ἐγὼ / I am not) in John 3:28 and Acts 13:25 (compare with Jesus in John 8:23, 17:14,16), and Pilate in a question (Μήτι ἐγὼ Ἰουδαῖός εἰμι; / Am I [a] Jew?) in John 18:35.

Old Testament
ἐγώ εἰμι also occurs without an explicit or implicit predicate nominative in the Septuagint, but instead either with a prepositional phrase such as in "μὴ ἀντὶ θεοῦ ἐγώ εἰμι ..." ("Am I in place of God ...") Gen 30:2, or with a predicative clause such as in "πάροικος καὶ παρεπίδημος ἐγώ εἰμι μεθ' ὑμῶν" ("As a foreigner and a sojourner I am with you") in Gen 23:4, or with the idiomatic meaning It is I such as in "καὶ εἶπεν Ἰωαβ ἀκούω ἐγώ εἰμι" ("And Joab said: I hear; it is I.") in 2 Sam 20:17.

It has been suggested that the unique expression of the Tetragrammaton יהוה  (yhwh) is a verbal cognate noun derived from היה (hayah), the Hebrew copulative otherwise known as the verb "to be".  Translations often render this word in compliance with the tradition of the Septuagint, "Lord". Later it has been pointed with the vowels of the word Elohim and transcribed as "Jehovah". Finally the Tetragrammaton was vocalized as Yahweh. But often found in apposition, if not in construct state (there is no way of telling) with elohim,  it suggests "the being" or the "I AM" of God.

See also
 I AM (book)
 I Am that I Am
 Ego eimi
 Holy Name of Jesus
 Names and titles of Jesus in the New Testament
 The Thunder, Perfect Mind
 Dinanukht

Further reading
 The “I am” of the fourth Gospel by Philip B. Harner , 1970

References

Christian terminology
Gospel of John
Language and mysticism